Xyletobius blackburni is a species of beetle in the family Ptinidae.

Subspecies
These four subspecies belong to the species Xyletobius blackburni:
 Xyletobius blackburni blackburni Perkins, 1910
 Xyletobius blackburni scutellaris Perkins, 1910
 Xyletobius blackburni simplex Perkins, 1910
 Xyletobius blackburni suturalis Perkins, 1910

References

Further reading

 
 
 
 

Ptinidae
Beetles described in 1910